The Common Cause Alliance (CCA) is a sports organization consisting of a collection of national federations on boxing which are campaigning to keep boxing in the Summer Olympics calendar from the 2024 edition in Paris and onwards.

The alliance was formed in early 2022 by 18 federations. It called for the Russian-led International Boxing Association to disclose its financial dealings with company Gazprom, determine the detrimental effects of the Russian invasion of Ukraine, and for IBA to take stronger action against the Russian Boxing Federation.

In May 2022, Dutch official Boris van der Vorst, who heads the group was ruled ineligible to challenge incumbent IBA president and Russian official Umar Kremlev in an elections. In September 2022 an extraordinary IBA congress decided against holding any new election allowing Kremlev to retain the presidency. By December 2022, the membership of the Common Cause Alliance has grown to 25 federations.

Members
 Boxing Australia
 Canadian Boxing Association
 Boxing Association of England
 French Boxing Federation
 Irish Athletic Boxing Association
 Dutch Boxing Federation
 Association of Boxing Alliances in the Philippines
 USA Boxing

References

Sports organizations established in 2022
2022 in boxing
Amateur boxing organizations
Boxing at the Summer Olympics
International sports boycotts